Gandab-e Olya or Gandab Olya may refer to:
 Gandab-e Olya, Kermanshah
 Gandab-e Olya, Kurdistan